Beeston Hill may refer to the following places:

 Beeston Hill, Leeds, an area of Leeds, West Yorkshire, England
 Beeston Hill, U.S. Virgin Islands, a settlement on the island of Saint Croix in the United States Virgin Islands
 Beeston Hill Y Station, a former secret listening station in Norfolk, England